Opilo is a genus of beetles in the subfamily Clerinae.

References 

 

Cleridae genera
Clerinae